Giraud Foster (8 November 1850 – 22 September 1945) was a businessman and socialite notable during America's gilded age. An avid bridge player, equestrian and sailor, Foster accumulated a large fortune from coal and shipping. Like his wife the former Jean Van Nest, whom he married in 1893, Foster could trace his family back to the early settlers of New York. Other sources show Foster's family arriving in the United States more recently, from Scotland, in the 1800s. The couple had one child, a son, also named Giraud, but always known as "Boy", born in 1904.

For the greater part of his long life, Foster resided at Bellefontaine, the classical 18th century-style mansion which he and his wife built, as a holiday 'cottage', between 1896 and 1898, at Lenox, Massachusetts.

During the Fosters' tenure, Bellefontaine became known as one of the great mansions of the gilded age. Designed by the eminent New York architectural firm of Carrere and Hastings, the house was built around an inner courtyard in a simple classic style; its principal facade dominated by a large portico. The design is reputed to be based on that of Ange-Jacques Gabriel's Petit Trianon at Versailles. While there are similarities between the two buildings, the dominating portico with a low upper floor above it, more closely resembles Gabriel's Pavilion de Louveciennes, while the rear facade shares many architectural similarities with the Chateau de Voisins also at Louveciennes.

While the Fosters spent their summers at Bellefontaine, they also had a winter home, Orange Grove, Aiken County, South Carolina. Jean Foster died there in 1932 and Foster sold the house three years later.

The Fosters were socially eminent public figures and entertained on a large scale. Foster was a member of the Knickerbocker Club and President of the Mahkeenac Boat Club and Canada's Restigouche Salmon Fishing Club. He was also a devout Christian and warden of Lenox's Trinity Episcopal Church.

Foster died at Bellefontaine in 1945 leaving an estate valued at $527,551.65. The house was sold, in 1947, together with all its furnishings and 182 acres of land for $80,000. Shortly afterwards a fire gutted its interiors.  The interior was rebuilt but not to anywhere near its elegant days of yore. After that, Bellefontaine was again sold to the Sacred Heart Priests and Brothers. The building was used as a minor seminary for boys interested in the priesthood. It was named Immaculate Heart of Mary Seminary. The S.C.J.s built a new attached wing which housed classrooms, rev rooms, a gymnasium, refectory, and a chapel.  It was used as a seminary from 1961 until its close in 1978. It was sold to another developer but nothing was done to the beautiful residence. Again it was sold in the early 80s. The new owners demolished the newer buildings and also restored the beautiful sunken garden that Giraud had loved so much. The exterior of the building was restored and the interior was again rebuilt to suit the many clients of Canyon Ranch, which is an elite health spa.

References

Gilded Age
American socialites
1850 births
1945 deaths
People from Lenox, Massachusetts